A statue of John Winthrop by Richard Saltonstall Greenough (sometimes called John Winthrop or Governor Winthrop) is installed outside Boston's First Church, in the U.S. state of Massachusetts.

Description
The bronze sculpture of Winthrop holding a book, a scroll, and the great seal measures approximately 7 ft. x 2 ft. 5 in. x 2 ft. 3 in. It rests on a textured concrete base that measures approximately 4 ft. 6 in. x 4 ft. x 8 ft. The statue is a replica of Greenough's marble sculpture installed in the United States Capitol's National Statuary Hall, in Washington, D.C., as part of the National Statuary Hall Collection. It cost $15,000 and was appropriated by the City of Boston.

An inscription on the front of the base reads: .

History
The statue was modeled in 1873 and cast in 1880. It was originally installed in Scollay Square (now known as Government Center), before being relocated to First Church in 1904. In 1968, a fire broke out at First Church, and the sculpture was toppled by collapsed walls. The statue's head was severed. It was put in storage in Quincy, Massachusetts, while the church was rebuilt. The memorial was reinstalled in 1975. It was surveyed by the Smithsonian Institution's "Save Outdoor Sculpture!" program in 1993.

References

Books in art
Bronze sculptures in Massachusetts
Concrete sculptures in the United States
Monuments and memorials in Boston
Outdoor sculptures in Boston
Sculptures of men in Massachusetts
Statues in Boston